The Frontier Nursing Service was founded in 1925 by Mary Breckinridge and provides healthcare services to rural, underserved populations and educates nurse-midwives.

The Service maintains six rural healthcare clinics in eastern Kentucky, the Mary Breckinridge Hospital (now part of Appalachian Regional Healthcare), the Mary Breckinridge Home Health Agency, the Frontier School of Midwifery and Family Nursing and the Bed and Breakfast Inn at Wendover, Kentucky.

History
The organization was founded in 1925 in Leslie County, Kentucky by Mary Breckinridge (1881–1965) shortly after she had witnessed the operation of the Highlands and Islands Medical Service which had been founded in Scotland twelve years earlier. Breckinridge intended that the Frontier Nursing Service would provide healthcare for children in remote rural areas, being moved to this work by the deaths of her own two children. Frontier Nursing Service was the first group in the United States to employ nurses who are also qualified midwives. Originally, the organization was known as the Kentucky Committee for Mothers and Babies. Breckinridge served as Director until her death in 1965.

The Frontier Nursing Service grew rapidly during its first five years. With the help of two nurses, Edna Rockstroh and Freda Caffin, Breckinridge opened the group's first clinic in Hyden, Kentucky in 1925. By December of that year Breckinridge had raised a log house in Wendover, Kentucky, called the Big House, that became her home and the Frontier Nursing Service's headquarters. The Hyden Hospital and Health Center opened its doors in 1928 and followed by nine outpost nursing centers in Leslie County and the Red Bird River section of Clay County, Kentucky.

Upon the outbreak of World War II Breckinridge no longer could send American nurses to Britain where they had been going for midwifery training. To prevent this from slowing its operations, the Frontier Nursing Service quickly established the Frontier Graduate School of Midwifery. The first class matriculated in November 1939, and the school has operated ever since. Reva Rubin which was one of the first specialists in maternity nursing worked here.In 1970, the school's name was changed to the Frontier School of Midwifery and Family Nursing (FSMFN). Now named Frontier Nursing University, it offers distance education to train its students. The Frontier Nursing Service was the subject of the 1931 documentary film, The Forgotten Frontier.

As the number of births decreased in Leslie County during the 1980s it became difficult to support a traditional midwifery program. During this time period, the Community-based Nurse-midwifery Education Program (CNEP) began as a pilot project funded by the PEW Foundation. The development of the CNEP was originally a cooperative effort of the Maternity Center Association (MCA), the National Association of Childbearing Centers (NACC), Frances Payne Bolton School of Nursing, Case Western Reserve University (FPBSON/CWRU) and the Frontier Nursing Service (FNS). The goal was to enable nurses to remain in their communities while obtaining graduate education as nurse-midwives and ultimately increase the number of practicing nurse-midwives working in underserved areas. Through an affiliation with FPBSON/CWRU students completed a certificate education with FSMFN and attained a master's degree in Nursing by completing nine credits on the FPBSON/CWRU campus in Cleveland, Ohio. The pilot project was very successful. In 1990, the FSMFN recognized that the CNEP model of education matched its own goals and mission. The President of the School and the Board of Directors voted to adopt the CNEP as its nurse-midwifery education program in 1991. Since then, FSMFN has graduated over 1000 nurse-midwives.

In the late 1960s, the Frontier Nursing Service recognized that as health care options became more complex, a broader based education was necessary for nurses to be able to provide comprehensive primary care to all family members. At this time the FSMFN developed the first certificate program to prepare family nurse practitioners. In 1970, the name of the School was changed to the Frontier School of Midwifery and Family Nursing (FSMFN) to reflect the addition of the FNP program. The last class to graduate from the combined family nurse-midwifery program was in August 1990. The Community-based Family Nurse Practitioner (CFNP) education program was reestablished in 1999 using the CNEP distance education model. With the acceptance of CFNP class 1 in 1999, the Frontier School of Midwifery and Family Nursing comes full circle in its mission to educate nurses to provide primary care that is comprehensive, safe, and culturally sensitive.

The Frontier Nursing Service Complex was listed on the National Register of Historic Places in 1991.  The listing included four contributing buildings and nine contributing structures/

In 2000, recognizing that students desired to complete their entire education at FSMFN using distance education methods, the Board of Directors approved a plan for FSMFN to pursue full accreditation as an independent graduate school which would grant a Master of Science in Nursing. There was much work to be done including a complete curriculum revision and the preparation of the faculty at the doctoral level. On December 6, 2004, the School was accredited by the Southern Association of Colleges and Schools to grant a Master of Science in Nursing Degree. The American College of Nurse-Midwives granted institutional accreditation as well as programmatic accreditation for the nurse-midwifery program in February 2005. National League for Nursing accreditation followed in March 2005.

Today the School offers several programs geared towards nurses who desire to pursue preparation as a nurse-midwife or nurse practitioner. These include a Master of Science in Nursing degree with tracks as a nurse-midwife, family nurse practitioner and women's health nurse practitioner. FSMFN also offers post-masters certificates in these specialties. The School is very proud of the advanced technology that allows us to educate students all over the world with the central location in historic Hyden, Kentucky, the birthplace of midwifery and family nursing in America. FSMFN now has graduates representing every state in the United States and seven foreign countries.

Impact
During its first thirty years of operation, all of the Frontier Nursing Service's maternal and infant outcome statistics were better than for the country as a whole. For example:

The maternal mortality rate for Frontier Nursing Services was 9.1 per 10,000 births, compared with 34 per 10,000 births for the United States as a whole.
Only 3.8 percent of babies tended by the Frontier Nursing Service had low birth weight, compared with 7.6 percent for the country overall.

By 1959, Frontier Nursing Service nurse-midwives had attended over 10,000 births

In 1972, the Service opened the forty-bed Mary Breckinridge Hospital and Health Center in Leslie County.

In 2011 after years of operating in the red and stopping services, Frontier Nursing Service sold Mary Breckenridge Hospital to Appalachian Regional Healthcare, completed on October 10, 2011.

In 2017, the Frontier Nursing Service purchased a campus in Versailles, KY. Since then, Frontier Nursing has talked about moving its entire nursing school to Versailles.

On September 26, 2019, a post on social media from a board of directors meeting created a major public backlash when the meeting minutes showed the Board was considering moving the cabin where Breckenridge used to practice nursing and live, the Breckenridge House.

Kentucky Law
In 2019, the General Assembly of the Commonwealth of Kentucky passed Senate Bill 84 to provide certification and regulation for midwives, as well as creating a new public council to implement new licensure requirements. Kentucky stopped certifying midwives in 1975, and there have been no clear regulations on the practice for more than thirty years. The advisory council is set up under the Board of Nursing, which will promulgate regulations to establish standards for training programs, licensing, transfer of care from a midwife to a hospital, disciplinary actions, and more, as well as define a list of conditions that require the collaboration, consultation or referral of a client to a physician or other appropriate healthcare provider.

The law also criminalizes unlicensed midwife services, although it does provide exceptions for traditional birth attendants for religious or cultural purposes and for family members and friends providing uncompensated care. It is unclear how these statutory terms will be interpreted and enforced.

References

Further reading
 Goan, Melanie Beals. Mary Breckinridge: The Frontier Nursing Service and Rural Health in Appalachia (University of North Carolina Press, 2008) 347 pp.

External links
Frontier Nursing Service website
American Nurses Association
The guide to the Frontier Nursing Service Medical Surveys, 1959-1971 housed at the University of Kentucky Libraries Special Collections Research Center.
Digitized copies of the Frontier Nursing Service Quarterly Bulletins housed at the University of Kentucky Libraries Special Collections Research Center.
Guide to the Frontier Nursing Service Collection, 1902-2006, 2005MS47 housed at the University of Kentucky Libraries Special Collections Research Center.
Guide to the Frontier Nursing Service records, 1789-1985, 85M1 housed at the University of Kentucky Libraries Special Collections Research Center.
The Guide to the Frontier Nursing Service Oral History Project at the Louie B. Nunn Center for Oral History at the University of Kentucky.
Guide to the Frontier Nursing Service Medical Surveys, 1959-1971 housed at the University of Kentucky Libraries Special Collections Research Center

Companies based in Kentucky
Nursing organizations in the United States
Healthcare in Kentucky
History of nursing
National Register of Historic Places in Leslie County, Kentucky
Buildings and structures completed in 1928
1928 establishments in Kentucky
Midwifery organizations
Midwifery in the United States